Smaranda is a Romanian female given name that may refer to:
 Smaranda Brăescu (1897–1948), Romanian parachuting and aviation pioneer
  (born 1950), Romanian politician
 Smaranda Gheorghiu (1857–1944), Romanian poet, novelist, essayist, playwright, educator, feminist, and traveler
 Smaranda Olarinde, Nigerian professor of law

Romanian feminine given names